FLR may refer to:
 FLR, old IATA code for Fall River Municipal Airport, a defunct airport in Massachusetts, United States
 FLR, IATA code for Florence Airport, in Italy
 FLR, NYSE ticker symbol for Fluor Corporation, an American engineering and construction firm
 flr, ISO 639-3 code for the Fuliiru language, spoken in Congo
 Family Law Reports, a law report series for family law cases in the United Kingdom
 Family Life Radio, an American radio network
 Federal Law Reports, a series of Australian law reports
 Female-led relationship, a type of interpersonal relationship
 Fife Lake Railway, in Canada
 Forest landscape restoration, forest restoration intended to restore landscape appearance as well as ecology
 Fuzzy Logic Recordings, a Canadian record label
  (Luxembourg Rugby Federation), Luxembourgeoise sports organization